is an Italian-Japanese animation television series written by Marco Pagot and Gi Pagot and directed by Kenji Kodama. It consists of 52 half-hour episodes. The first season was aired in France in 1991. The second season was aired in 1996.

The show was co-produced by RAI, Seoul Movie and Tokyo Movie Shinsha.

Plot

Characters
Antoinette "Tony" Dubois: She is the main character. A newspaper reporter who moves to Paris and works on La Voix de Paris (The Voice of Paris)
Alain: Photographer and partner of Tony
Madame Lapin: A notorious criminal
Monsieur Chailleau
Inspecteur Calvignac
Professeur

Release

Music
The opening theme and the ending theme "We're going to Paris" both performed by the Italian singer Simona Patitucci. Music composed by the Italian musicians and composers Pino Massara and Stelvio Cipriani.

Reception

References

External links
 Reporter Blues on TMS Entertainment's official website 
 Reporter Blues on TMS Entertainment's official website 
 
 
 

1991 anime television series debuts
Italian children's animated adventure television series
Japanese children's animated adventure television series
TMS Entertainment